Urias Africanus McGill (c. 1823 – 1866) was an African-American who emigrated with his family to Liberia in the 19th century. He was a member of the well-known McGill family, and he and his brothers established a successful trading business out of Monrovia.

Biography
Urias McGill was born free in Baltimore, Maryland, to George R. and Angelina McGill. When he was eight years old, he and his family emigrated to Liberia aboard the Reaper. His mother died shortly after they arrived in Monrovia in February 1831. In 1854 Urias and his three brothers formed the trading company McGill Brothers.

References

Americo-Liberian people
Pre-emancipation African-American history
Americo-Liberian families
Urias
African-American businesspeople
19th-century American businesspeople
Year of birth uncertain
1866 deaths
Liberian businesspeople